Ulikowo  is a village in the administrative district of Gmina Stargard, within Stargard County, West Pomeranian Voivodeship, in north-western Poland.

The village has a population of 564.

Notable residents
 David Hollatz (1648–1713), Lutheran dogmatician

See also
 History of Pomerania

References

Ulikowo